Turunçova   is a town in Finike district of Antalya Province, Turkey. At  it is  situated on Turkish state highway . The population of Turunçova  was 8237  as of 2012. The area around Turunçova was always inhabited during the historical ages and the ancient city Limyra is at the east of Turunçova. In 1956, two former villages named Çavdır and Bağyaka were merged to form the town of Turunçova. The town economy depends on citrus farming and industry.

References

Populated places in Antalya Province
Towns in Turkey
Finike District